Talat N'Yaaqoub is a small town and rural commune in Al Haouz Province of the Marrakesh-Tensift-El Haouz region of Morocco. At the time of the 2004 census, the commune had a total population of 7702 people living in 1494 households.

References

Populated places in Al Haouz Province
Rural communes of Marrakesh-Safi